The 2018 V.League 2 (referred to as  An Cường V.League 2 for sponsorship reasons) is the 24th season of V.League 2, Vietnam's second tier professional football league. The season began on 14 April 2018 and will finish on 29 September 2018. The season started with 10 clubs.

Changes from last season

Team changes
The following teams had changed division since the 2017 season.

To V.League 2
Promoted from 2017 Vietnamese Second League
 Công An Nhân Dân
 Bình Định TMS
 Hà Nội B
Relegated from V.League 1
 Long An

From V.League 2
Relegated to 2018 Vietnamese Second League
 NonePromoted to V.League 1
 Nam Định

Rule changes
There is one direct promotion spot for the champion. The team finishing second will play a play-off match against the 13th-placed club of 2018 V.League 1. The club finishing last will be relegated to the 2019 Second League.

Name changes
In 16 May 2018, Bình Định had changed its name to Bình Định TMS.

Teams

Stadiums and locations

Personnel and kits

League table

Results

Positions by round

Season progress

Attendances

By round

By club

Season statistics

Top scorers

Own goals

Hattrick

 Note: (H)-Home; (A)-Away

References

External links
Official Page

V.League 2
2018 in Vietnamese football